is a 2016 Japanese jidaigeki action film directed by Yukihiko Tsutsumi. It was released in Japan by Shochiku and Nikkatsu on September 22, 2016.

Plot

Cast
Nakamura Kankurō VI as Sarutobi Sasuke
Tori Matsuzaka as Kirigakure Saizō
Yuko Oshima as Hotaru
Kento Nagayama as Nezu Jinpachi
Mitsuomi Takahashi as Kakei Jūzō
Tarō Suruga
Ryouta Murai

Yuma Ishigaki
Kazuki Kato
Ken Matsudaira (special appearance) as Tokugawa Ieyasu
Masaya Kato as Sanada Yukimura
Shinobu Otake as Yodo-dono

Reception

References

External links
 

Jidaigeki films
Japanese action films
2016 action films
Shochiku films
Nikkatsu films
Films directed by Yukihiko Tsutsumi
Cultural depictions of Sanada clan
Cultural depictions of Tokugawa Ieyasu
2010s Japanese films